The  is a politician membership  which promotes exchange and friendship between Japan and South Korea. It is led by former prime minister Yoshiro Mori and is composed primarily of Diet members from Japan's Liberal Democratic Party.

The Union is the successor group to the former , assuming its current name in 1975.

Other prominent members include Fukushiro Nukaga (Executive Director) and Shinzō Abe (Assistant Executive Director).

External links
 Japan-Korea Parliamentarians' Union' official website

Politics of Japan